Madeline Obrigewitsch (born 11 August 1995), better known by her stage name Madeline Juno, is a German singer-songwriter. She released her first single "Error" in November 2013.

Early life 
Madeline Juno was born on 11 August 1995. Her father is a drummer and her mother is a pianist. She grew up in Offenburg-Griesheim in the Black Forest in Germany. She graduated from Realschule in 2012 and went to Gymnasium in Lahr. When she was 6, Madeline Juno was taught to play piano by her mother. At the age of 12, she started playing guitar and writing her own songs.

Career 

Madeline Juno recorded her first songs and uploaded them on YouTube when she was 14. In October 2012, she went on tour with Tom Beck, and in September 2013, she was on tour with Philipp Poisel. In 2013, Juno signed a record deal with Universal Music Group. Juno's first single Error premiered on 14 September 2013 on YouTube. The single was officially released on 1 November 2013. Two weeks after its release, the single entered the German charts at position 63. Her first album, called The Unknown, was originally scheduled to be released in January 2014, but that date was postponed to 7 March 2014. Juno performed her song Error on 23 November 2013 in the television show Verstehen Sie Spaß?. She was one of the eight acts to compete in Unser Song für Dänemark, the German national final for the Eurovision Song Contest 2014 in Denmark. There she performed her song "Like Lovers Do" but she was voted out after the first round. That song is also featured on the soundtrack of the film Pompeii. She was part of the German jury for the final.

On 11 August 2014, which was also her nineteenth birthday, she released a music video for the song "Always This Way".

In 2015 Madeline Juno announced her second studio album, Salvation. Some days later she published the song Into the Night. Her first official single was released on 12 February 2016 and is called Stupid Girl. The album was released two weeks later on 26 February 2016.

On 30 September 2016 Juno released her EP Waldbrand which contains five songs that are all in German language.

In January 2017 she published the song Für Immer as the title track for the movie Wendy – Der Film.
A few months later, Juno announced her new studio album DNA to be released on 8 September 2017 which is completely in German language. The first single, Still, was published on 5 May 2017, the second one, Gift, on 28 July 2017.

After touring Juno released her latest single Borderline on 15 June 2018 which is not part of any album yet. The music video was shot in Hong Kong.

Discography

Studio albums

Extended plays

Singles

Promotional singles

References

External links 

 
 
 
 

1995 births
Living people
German women singer-songwriters
People from Offenburg
Universal Music Group artists
21st-century German women singers